The Verrazzano Open is a professional tennis tournament played on clay courts. It is currently part of the Association of Tennis Professionals (ATP) Challenger Tour. It is held annually in Sophia Antipolis, France since 2017.

Past finals

Singles

Doubles

References

External links
 Official website

ATP Challenger Tour
Clay court tennis tournaments
Tennis tournaments in France